Black Flamenco is the second studio album released by Spanish singer Estrella. The album was nominated for a Latin Grammy Award for Best Female Pop Vocal Album.

Track listing
 Si me sientes
 Aquí seguiré
 Hoy quiero decirte
 Persuasión
 Tierra
 Designios
 Dime
 Todo cambiará
 Mírame
 Cante al amor

2009 albums
Spanish-language albums